Adenosine 3'-phospho 5'-phosphosulfate transporter 1 is a protein that in humans is encoded by the SLC35B2 gene.

See also
 Solute carrier family

References

Further reading

Solute carrier family